The Parkwood Formation is a geologic formation in Alabama. It preserves fossils dating back to the Carboniferous period.

See also

 List of fossiliferous stratigraphic units in Alabama
 Paleontology in Alabama

References
 

Carboniferous Alabama
Carboniferous southern paleotropical deposits